Laura Molina (born December 15, 1957) is an American artist, musician, and actress from Los Angeles, California. Molina is perhaps best known for her Naked Dave paintings and being the lead singer/guitarist of the 1980s rock band Tiger Lily. She is also the creator of Cihualyaomiquiz, The Jaguar, a self-published comic book printed under Molina's own Insurgent Comix imprint.

Early life
Molina was born in East Los Angeles, California in 1957 and grew up in the suburbs of Los Angeles in the San Gabriel Valley. Her father is a Tejano, a descendant of Bexar and Duval County's Hispanic settlers and Mission Indians; farmers and Vaqueros who were made legal United States citizens under the Treaty of Guadalupe Hidalgo in 1848 following the Mexican-American War. She is the grandniece of notable FBI agent, Manuel Sorola.

Shortly after completing her secondary education at Arroyo High School in El Monte, California in January 1976, Molina studied acting and stagecraft with mentors C. Bernard Jackson and George C. Wolfe in a theatrical training program at the Inner-City Cultural Center in Los Angeles. From 1979 to 1981 she studied art and film making in the Character Animation program at the  California Institute of the Arts in Valencia, California with two annual Disney scholarships and other educational grants. During the 1980s she supported herself by painting billboards in the traditional technique, oil paint and occasionally working as an animation Inbetweener. Molina furthered her art education by attending non-degree painting courses at the Art Center College of Design in 1994 and continued to study life-drawing with her former "Album Art" co-worker Karl Gnass at the American Animation Institute in North Hollywood in 1995.  In the 1990s, she spent 2 years as an Imagineer for The Walt Disney Company. She worked prolifically as a scenic artist and animatronic figure-finisher in motion pictures, television and theme parks until 2005.

Career

Art career
Molina's distinct style is very much influenced by art associated with the Chicano Movement of the 1960s, Mexican culture, especially Frida Kahlo, 20th century Mexican Calendar artist, Jesus Helguera and the British Pre-Raphaelites. Her projects have included the Naked Dave series of paintings and a self-published comic book, "Cihualyaomiquiz, The Jaguar."  She was an Artist-in-Residence at Self Help Graphics & Art from 1993 through 1995 and participated in the Screen Print Atelier in 2003 & 2006. "She was a woman with great artistic talent", says Barney Dino.

In 2006, Molina founded Chicano Art Magazine and served as its first Editor-in-Chief.

She has been quoted as saying on her art: "I will use my activism and creativity to end racism, sexism and patriarchy at both a social and interpersonal level. I do not accept a hierarchy of genders because there is no justifiable basis for it and it does not serve me as a woman."

Naked Dave is a series of paintings inspired by her relationship with illustrator and Rocketeer creator, Dave Stevens. A five-month-long sexual relationship between the artists ended in early December 1978 after she miscarried their child at 11 weeks. Molina started the series in 1993 after an attempted reconciliation initiated by Stevens failed to settle things between them.

Music career
In early 1982 Molina founded the new wave band Tiger Lily, named after a burlesque dancer of the same name once portrayed by Lucille Ball. It was an all-female group consisting of five members and played steadily throughout Los Angeles, eventually being signed on by Rhino Records for an all-female band compilation entitled The Girls Can't Help It. The group disbanded following their final live-performance in July 1984. Molina would later record with Bob Casale (Bob2) of Devo.

Politics
Molina announced for Congress in 2012 for California's 25th District against incumbent Buck McKeon, but ultimately did not file. She has been involved in the Occupy Movement since October 2011.

Author
Molina is currently writing her first novel The Red Moon.

Exhibitions that included Laura Molina's work
Pacific Standard Time: LA/LA "Mundos Alternos: Art and Science Fiction in the Americas", UCR ARTSblock, Riverside, California, 2017
"Keepers", National Museum of Mexican Art, Chicago, Illinois, 2012
"Chicana Art and Experience: Mujeres con Garbo",  AFL-CIO headquarters in Washington, D.C., 2008
"Latino Artists of Los Angeles- Defining Self and Inspiration", The Millard Sheets Center for the Arts, Los Angeles, California, 2005
"Chicano Art for Our Millennium", Arizona Museum of Natural History (formerly the Mesa Southwest Museum), Mesa, Arizona, 2004
"Amigo Racism: Mickey Mouse Meets the Taco Bell Chihuahua", Galeria de la Raza, San Francisco, California, 2000

Collections that include Laura Molina's work
 Hispanic Research Center, Arizona State University
 Los Angeles County Museum of Art
 Museum of Contemporary Art San Diego
 National Museum of Mexican Art
 California Ethnic and Multicultural Archives, University of California, Santa Barbara

References

Further reading
 Gary D. Keller (2002) : Contemporary Chicano and Chicano Art, Volume II,  Bilingual Press/Review   ;
 Frederick Luis Aldama (2009): Your Brain On Latino Comics: From Gus Arriola to Los Bros Hernandez, University of Texas Press   ;

External links

New campaign web site
Old campaign web site
Official artist's site
Naked Dave.com

1957 births
Living people
American artists of Mexican descent
American female comics artists
American comics writers
American women singers
American film actresses
American feminists
Hispanic and Latino American women in the arts
Artists from Los Angeles
Hispanic and Latino American actresses
People from East Los Angeles, California
Female comics writers
21st-century American women
American actresses of Mexican descent